Renáta Kellnerová (born 4 July 1967) is the widow of Czech billionaire entrepreneur and the founder of the PPF Group Petr Kellner who died in March 2021 in a helicopter crash.

Kellnerová's husband, Petr Kellner, founded the PPF Group in the early 1990s; the company became one of the largest investment groups in Europe, with assets worth around 39.7 billion euros (as of the end of 2020). From 1993 to 1997, under her maiden surname Hacklová, she was a member of the board of directors of PPF moravskoslezský investiční fond a.s., one of the predecessors of PPF Group.

In 2002, she co-founded the Educa Foundation which aimed at providing scholarships to students of the Open Gate - Grammar and Primary School in Babice. In 2009, the Kellners founded The Kellner Family Foundation that over the ten years of its existence dispersed CZK 1.6 billion in support of educational activities in the Czech Republic.

After the death of Petr Kellner, Kellnerová became a beneficiary owner of the 98.93% Kellner’s stake in the PPF Group, becoming the richest Czech citizen.

Renáta Kellnerová made the 2022 Forbes Billionaires List with an estimated wealth of $16.6 billion and occupied the 104th position.

She has three daughters, including Anna Kellnerová, a prominent Czech showjumper. With her husband, they also raised Kellner's son from a previous relationship.

References 

1967 births
Living people
Czech billionaires
Female billionaires